Dr Irene Daw (13 February 1941 – 30 October 2010) was a British sports shooter and Olympian. Daw represented Great Britain at the 1984 Summer Olympics, the first Olympic Games to include 10 metre air rifle. At the 1979 ISSF World Shooting Championships, she won a Bronze medal as part of the Women's Air Rifle Team.

References

External links

1941 births
2010 deaths
British female sport shooters
Olympic shooters of Great Britain
Shooters at the 1984 Summer Olympics
ISSF rifle shooters
20th-century British women